The 1991–92 Primera División de Fútbol Profesional season as known as the Copa Taca is the 40th tournament of El Salvador's Primera División since its establishment of the National League system in 1948. The tournament was scheduled to end in, 1991. Luis Angel Firpo, the best regular season team, won the championship match against Alianza FC.

Teams

Managerial changes

During the season

Final

Top scorers

List of foreign players in the league
This is a list of foreign players in 1991-1992. The following players:
have played at least one  game for the respective club.
have not been capped for the El Salvador national football team on any level, independently from the birthplace

Acajutla
 

ADET
  Julio César Arzú
  Anthony Matthews Bailey
  Gilberto Yearwood

C.D. Águila
 

Alianza F.C.
  Eduardo "Tanque" Ramírez
  Carlos Solar
  Raul Toro
  Gustavo Faral
  Julio da Rosa

Atletico Marte
  Herny Vélez de la Torre
  Pastor Martínez
  Agustin Castillo
  José Luis Cardozo

 (player released mid season)
  (player Injured mid season)
 Injury replacement player

Cojutepeque
 

C.D. FAS
  Fulgencio Deonel Bordon
  Hector "El Indio" Molina
  Luis "El Flaco" Heimen
  Gustavo "El Gaucho" Lucas

C.D. Luis Ángel Firpo
  Toninho Dos Santos
  Nildeson
  Fernando de Moura
  Julio César Chávez

Fuerte San Francisco
  Ruben Alonso
  Gustavo Faral

Metapan

External links
 
 
 

1991